Crystal Palace started their second season in a new division, having gained promotion from the Southern League Division Two the previous season. There were a number of personnel changes this season, with Archie Grant and captain Ted Birnie moving to Chelsea and George Walker going to New Brompton. Palace's hat-trick hero in their FA Cup exploits of last season, Walter Watkins, also moved on to Northampton Town. In their places Palace brought in a number of new faces.  Charles Ryan joined from Nunhead, Thomas Wills from Newcastle, Bill Forster from Sheffield United and Bill Ledger from Pryhope Villa.  Wilf Innerd was made captain and played in all but one of the club's League and Cup matches. The club struggled to find their feet on the new division, and failed to score in 13 of their matches, finishing the season in 19th position, one place off the bottom.  This was enough to ensure safety though, as for this season there was no relegation. Palace again called on a number of amateurs from the local area and beyond, including Henry Littlewort. Littlewort, who made his only appearance for the club this season, would go on to win a gold medal with the British Football team in the 1912 Olympics.

Southern Football League First Division

FA Cup

After their exploits in the FA Cup the previous season, Crystal Palace were entered into the Cup in the final qualifying round by the Football Association. They drew Rotherham County, overcoming them 4-0 at Stamford Bridge.  The match was a home tie for Palace, but due to their Crystal Palace ground already being booked for a rugby international the club had to have the tie moved.  The next round, the first round proper, saw them drawn against the biggest club of the time, Newcastle United.  Unbeaten at home in over a year, and unbeaten at home in the Cup since the previous century, Newcastle were expected to easily defeat Palace, but in the first great FA Cup shock, Palace went to Newcastle and won 1-0. The second round saw Palace defeat Fulham in a replay, and then the club took Brentford to a replay and won that too.  Drawn at home against Everton in the quarter finals, Palace took a 1-0 lead, but were unable to hold on and drew 1-1 in front of their highest crowd to date of 35,000.  In the replay at Goodison Park Palace lost 4-0 and another good cup run was at an end.

Squad statistics

Notes

References

Bibliography

 Matthews, Tony (editor). We All Follow The Palace. Juma, 1998. 

Citations

Crystal Palace F.C. seasons
Crystal Palace F.C.